The Old Bergen Church is a historic church congregation in Jersey City, Hudson County, New Jersey, United States. Established in 1660 in what was then the Dutch colony of New Netherland, it is the oldest continuous religious congregation in what is today the State of New Jersey. The congregation is jointly affiliated with the Reformed Church in America and the Presbyterian Church (USA).
The church was added to the National Register of Historic Places on August 14, 1973. The original church building was constructed in 1680 and the current edifice was built in 1841.

History

The congregation was formed in the Dutch colonial village of Bergen in 1660, located across the Hudson River from the town of New Amsterdam in what is today Lower Manhattan. The first services were held in a log schoolhouse. In 1680 an octagonal, sandstone church was built by William Day. The church was located on Vroom Street, between Bergen and Tuers Avenues. The congregation outgrew the original church and a second church was erected in 1773. This church was also made of sandstone and was located at the corner of Bergen Avenue and Vroom Street. The third and current church was built in 1841 by William H. Kirk and Company and Clark and Van Nest.

Notable burials
The Old Bergen Church Cemetery and the Speer Cemetery are affiliated with the church.
 Jane Tuers (1745–1834) – American Revolutionary War patriot.

Gallery

See also

 Bergen, New Netherland
 Bergen Square
 National Register of Historic Places listings in Hudson County, New Jersey
 Oldest churches in the United States
 Van Wagenen House
 Newkirk House
 List of cemeteries in Hudson County, New Jersey
 Voorleser

References

External links

 Old Bergen Church – Official Website
 
 List of burials
 View of Old Bergen Church via Google Street View

Churches in Hudson County, New Jersey
Churches on the National Register of Historic Places in New Jersey
History of Jersey City, New Jersey
Churches in Jersey City, New Jersey
Churches completed in 1841
Reformed Church in America churches in New Jersey
Presbyterian churches in New Jersey
1660 establishments in the Dutch Empire
1660 establishments in North America
National Register of Historic Places in Hudson County, New Jersey
Establishments in New Netherland
New Jersey Register of Historic Places